Rodovia Floriano Rodrigues Pinheiro (official designation SP-123) is a single-lane highway in the state of São Paulo, Brazil. It connects the Rodovia Carvalho Pinto (SP-070) and the Rodovia Presidente Dutra (BR-116) nearby the city of Taubaté, to the mountain resort of Campos do Jordão.

SP-123 is one of the most scenic roads in the state. Just a short 28 km, it ascends from the 500 m above sea level of the Paraíba River valley to more than 1,600 m altitude of Campos do Jordão, with many meandering curves, sharp inclines and a 270 m tunnel along the face of the Mantiqueira mountain range. In some places the view towards the valley is stunning, and the cities of Taubaté, Guaratinguetá, Pindamonhangaba, Caçapava and São José dos Campos, as well as the distant Serra do Mar, which separates the plateau from the coastline, can be seen in a clear day. Rich pine temperate forests line along the road. Picturesque stalls by the road sell milk directly from the cow, conserves, sweets, wines, smoked trout, brandy (cachaça), cheese and typical artworks of the region, very Swiss-like. Two belvederes in key places allow tourists and voyagers to enjoy the best views.

The road is managed and maintained by the Department of Roads of the State of São Paulo (DER). Toll is not required.

See also
 Highway system of São Paulo

Highways in São Paulo (state)